Pedro Pedraza Reyna (born 30 April 2000) is a Mexican professional footballer who plays as a midfielder for Liga MX club Pachuca.

Career statistics

Club

Honours
Pachuca
Liga MX: Apertura 2022

References

External links

 
 

2000 births
Living people
Association football midfielders
Ascenso MX players
Liga de Expansión MX players
Liga MX players
Liga Premier de México players
C.F. Pachuca players
Mineros de Zacatecas players
Footballers from Nuevo León
Sportspeople from Monterrey
Mexican footballers